Gooseberry most often refers to a cultivated plant from two species of the genus Ribes:

 Ribes uva-crispa native to Europe, northwestern Africa and southwestern Asia.
 Ribes hirtellum, American gooseberry
 Hybrids between Ribes hirtellum and Ribes uva-crispa, including most of the cultivated gooseberry cultivars

Gooseberry may also refer to:

 Gooseberry (gene), a pair-rule gene in Drosophila
 Gooseberry, a structural element of the artificial Mulberry harbours used in World War II
 Sea gooseberry, a common name for some ctenophores (comb jellies), particularly Pleurobrachia

Places
 Gooseberry, Oregon, an unincorporated community
 Gooseberry Beach, a beach in Newport, Rhode Island
 Gooseberry Cove, a settlement near Trinity Bay, Newfoundland & Labrador
 Gooseberry Falls, a state park in Silver Creek Township, Lake County, Minnesota
 Gooseberry Hill, a suburb of Perth, Western Australia
 Gooseberry Island, Newfoundland and Labrador, a former settlement near Bonavista, Newfoundland & Labrador
 Gooseberry Lake, a lake in Saskatchewan, Canada
 Gooseberry Lake Provincial Park, a park in Alberta, Canada
 Gooseberry Point, port/dock near Lummi Island, Washington, United States